|}

The Prix Ganay is a Group 1 flat horse race in France open to thoroughbreds aged four years or older. It is run over a distance of 2,100 metres (about 1 mile and 2½ furlongs) at Longchamp in late April or early May.

History
The event was established in 1889, and it was originally called the Prix des Sablons. It was initially contested over 2,000 metres, and held in late March or early April.

The Prix des Sablons was abandoned throughout World War I, with no running from 1915 to 1918. It was run at Maisons-Laffitte over 2,100 metres in 1944 and 1945.

The event was renamed in memory of Jean de Ganay (1861–1948), a former president of the Société d'Encouragement, in 1949.

The present system of race grading was introduced in 1971, and the Prix Ganay was classed at Group 1 level. From this point it was run over 2,100 metres in late April or early May.

The leading horses from the Prix Ganay often go on to compete in the Prix de l'Arc de Triomphe. The last to win both races in the same year was Waldgeist in 2019.

Records
Most successful horse (3 wins):
 Cirrus des Aigles – 2012, 2014, 2015

Leading jockey (6 wins):
 Yves Saint-Martin – Relko (1964), Taj Dewan (1968), Rheingold (1973), Allez France (1974, 1975), Sagace (1985)

Leading trainer (7 wins):

 André Fabre – Creator (1990), Subotica (1992), Indian Danehill (2000), Cutlass Bay (2010), Cloth of Stars (2017), Waldgeist (2019), Mare Australis (2021)

Leading owner (6 wins):
 Marcel Boussac – Goyescas (1933), Goya II (1939, 1940), Djebel (1942), Goyama (1948), Nirgal (1949)

Winners since 1970

Earlier winners

 1889: Acheron
 1890: Le Sancy
 1891: Barberousse
 1892: Berenger
 1893: Gouverneur
 1894: Galette
 1895: Monsieur Gabriel
 1896: Le Sagittaire
 1897: Champaubert
 1898: Quilda
 1899: Gardefeu
 1900: Fourire
 1901: Kremlin
 1902: Codoman
 1903: La Camargo
 1904: Caius
 1905: Caius
 1906: Rataplan
 1907: Maintenon
 1908: Moulins la Marche
 1909: L'Inconnu
 1910: Chulo
 1911: Ossian
 1912: Cadet Roussel
 1913: Shannon
 1914: Nimbus
 1915–18: no race
 1919: Ramscapelle
 1920: Samourai
 1921: Sourbier
 1922: Ksar
 1923: Le Prodige
 1924: Massine
 1925: Cadum
 1926: Nid d'Or
 1927: Biribi
 1928: Nino
 1929: Rovigo
 1930: Barrabas
 1931: La Savoyarde
 1932: Amfortas
 1933: Goyescas
 1934: Rodosto
 1935: Rentenmark
 1936: Ortolan
 1937: Chuchoteur
 1938: Victrix
 1939: Goya II
 1940: Goya II
 1941: Maurepas
 1942: Djebel
 1943: Tornado / Arcot 1
 1944: Norseman
 1945: Seer
 1946: Basileus
 1947: Chanteur
 1948: Goyama
 1949: Nirgal
 1950: Fontenay
 1951: Tantieme
 1952: Mat de Cocagne
 1953: Guersant
 1954: Otto
 1955: Elu
 1956: Beau Prince
 1957: Tanerko
 1958: Tanerko
 1959: Chief 2
 1960: Marino
 1961: Javelot
 1962: Misti
 1963: Exbury
 1964: Relko
 1965: Free Ride
 1966: Diatome
 1967: Behistoun
 1968: Taj Dewan
 1969: Carmarthen
</div>
1 The 1943 race was a dead-heat and has joint winners.2 Balbo and Malefaim finished first and second in 1959, but both were disqualified and the race was awarded to the third-placed horse.

See also
 List of French flat horse races
 Recurring sporting events established in 1889 – the Prix Ganay is included under its original title, Prix des Sablons.

References

 France Galop / Racing Post:

 galop.courses-france.com:
 1889–1919, 1920–1949, 1950–1979, 1980–present
 france-galop.com – A Brief History: Prix Ganay.
 galopp-sieger.de – Prix Ganay (ex Prix des Sablons).
 ifhaonline.org – International Federation of Horseracing Authorities – Prix Ganay (2019).
 pedigreequery.com – Prix Ganay – Longchamp.

Open middle distance horse races
Longchamp Racecourse
Horse races in France
Recurring sporting events established in 1889
1889 establishments in France